Leenders is a Dutch patronymic surname, derived from the given name Leendert (a Dutch version of "Leonard"). Among variant forms are Leendertse and Lenders. Notable people with the surname include:

Claudia Leenders (born 1994), Dutch slalom canoeist
Henk Leenders (born 1950), Dutch Labour Party politician
Herman Leenders (born 1960), Flemish writer and poet
Toon Leenders (born 1986), Dutch handball player
Lenders
John Lenders (born 1958), Australian (Victoria) politician
Rea Lenders (born 1980), Dutch trampoline gymnast
Jozef Lenders (born 1957) Dutch filmmaker and screenwriter

References

Dutch-language surnames
Patronymic surnames